Ric Carrott (born February 5, 1949) is an American actor who was active during the 1970s.

Youthful-looking and handsome, Carrott's only regular television series role was as Captain Chris Gentry, on the Saturday morning children's series Space Academy, but he made guest appearances on numerous popular shows of the decade. These included Nanny and the Professor, The Partridge Family, Love American Style, Dirty Sally, The Bob Newhart Show, The Odd Couple, The Blue Knight, The Streets of San Francisco, Lucas Tanner, S.W.A.T., Cannon, and later The Rockford Files, Starsky and Hutch, Barnaby Jones, Fantasy Island and Three's Company.

Carrott originated the role of Chuck Cunningham, in the pilot for Happy Days (which aired as a segment of Love, American Style, "Love and the Happy Days"), later played by Gavan O'Herlihy in the series.

His film work includes roles in The Swinging Cheerleaders (also known as Locker Room Girls) (1974), Earthquake (1974), Slashed Dreams (1975), Mother, Jugs & Speed (1976), Marathon Man (1976), and the television movies A Summer Without Boys (1973), Hurricane (1974), SST: Death Flight (1977), and When Hell was in Session (1979).

Filmography

External links
 

American male film actors
American male television actors
Living people
20th-century American male actors
1949 births